S-444,823 is a drug developed by Shionogi which is a cannabinoid agonist. It was developed as an antipruritic, and has moderate selectivity for the CB2 subtype, having a CB2 affinity of 18nM, and 32x selectivity over the CB1 receptor. In animal studies it showed analgesic effects and strongly reduced itching responses, but without producing side effects such as sedation and catalepsy that are seen with centrally acting CB1 agonists.

See also
 JTE 7-31
 RQ-00202730
 S-777,469

References

Cannabinoids
Nitrogen heterocycles
Thiazoles